The Iranian ambassador in Berlin is the official representative of the Government in Tehran to the Federal Government of Germany.

List of representatives

See also
 List of ambassadors to Germany
 Germany–Iran relations

References 

Ambassadors of Iran to Germany
Germany
Iran